Sanaullah Khan can refer to:

 Sanaullah Khan (cricketer, born 1966)
 Sanaullah Khan (cricketer, born 1978)